Rytigynia binata is a species of flowering plant in the family Rubiaceae. It is endemic to Tanzania.

Sources 

Endemic flora of Tanzania
Vanguerieae
Vulnerable plants
Taxonomy articles created by Polbot